An orifice is any opening, mouth, hole or vent, as in a pipe, a plate, or a body

 Body orifice, any opening in the body of a human or animal
Orifice plate, a restriction used to measure flow or to control pressure or flow, sometimes given specialised names:
 Calibrated orifice, used to control pressure or flow
 Restrictive flow orifice, used to control flow
 Miss Shilling's orifice, used to control flow in the engines of early Spitfire and Hurricane fighter aeroplanes
 Back Orifice, a controversial computer program designed for remote system administration

See also
 Choked flow
 Needle valve
 Nozzle
 Venturi effect
 Flow measurement